Bulltoftaparken is a park in Malmö, Sweden.

External links
Malmö City - Bulltoftaparken 

Parks in Malmö